Bufoceratias thele is a species of double angler, a type of anglerfish. It is endemic to the western Pacific Ocean.

References

Diceratiidae
Deep sea fish
Taxa named by Ken Roger Uwate
Fish described in 1979